Donna Damerel (July 8, 1912 – February 15, 1941) was an American actress.

Early years
Damerel was born on July 8, 1912, in Chicago, the daughter of vaudeville performers George Damerel and Myrtle Vail Damerel. She had one brother. When she was 15, she left home to join the chorus of a musical comedy. Later she joined her parents' vaudeville team.

Career
After vaudeville's decline ended the Damerels' performing team, the family lived comfortably until "our savings were wiped out, and we were destitute." Damerel and her mother began to work on radio. They debuted the Myrt and Marge radio program in Chicago on November 2, 1931, with Damerel portraying the daughter, Marge, and Vail portraying the mother, Myrt.

A 1932 poll conducted by a radio magazine named Damerel radio's "it girl". The recognition included looks, microphone personality, and voice as 15,704 listeners participated in the survey.

Damerel and Vail also starred in the Universal film Myrt and Marge (1933), which was based on the radio program. In 1938,they performed in Yes, My Darling Daughter in Yonkers, New York, at the Warburton Theatre.

Personal life and death
Damerel was divorced from singer William J. Kretsinger on December 22, 1939. At the time of her death She was married to Peter J. Fick. She had two sons by previous marriages. One of her sons was director and screenwriter Charles B. Griffith.

She died on February 15, 1941, shortly after giving birth to a son in Englewood Hospital in Englewood, New Jersey. She was 28 years old. The baby survived. Doctors said that her health appeared to be good when she entered the hospital.

References 

1912 births
1941 deaths
20th-century American actresses
Actresses from Chicago
American child actresses
American film actresses
American radio actresses
American stage actresses
Broadway theatre people
Deaths in childbirth
Vaudeville performers